Ceulanamaesmawr is a community in Ceredigion, Wales, consisting of Tal-y-bont, Bont-goch and the surrounding area.  The total population at the United Kingdom Census 2011 was 1,013.

In addition to being a community, Ceulanamaesmawr is also an electoral ward.

References

Communities in Ceredigion